Miguel Pardeza Pichardo (born 8 February 1965) is a Spanish retired professional footballer who played as a forward.

He was part of Real Madrid's generation of footballers known as La Quinta del Buitre, but spent the better part of his career at Real Zaragoza. After retiring as a player, he returned to his first club in directorial capacities.

Having appeared in 325 La Liga matches over 13 seasons (81 goals scored), Pardeza was part of the Spain squad at the 1990 World Cup.

Club career

Born in La Palma del Condado, Province of Huelva, Pardeza was a youth system graduate at Real Madrid, making his first-team debut during the 1983–84 season. After a loan at Real Zaragoza he returned, helping with 25 games and five goals to the side's 1987 national league conquest.

With the 1987–88 campaign already underway, Pardeza signed a permanent five-year contract with Zaragoza, going on to become one of the Aragonese team's most prominent members as an attacking player with skills, vision and netting ability (he scored in double figures in four seasons). In 1994–95 he netted 11 La Liga goals, while also helping them to that season's UEFA Cup Winners' Cup against Arsenal.

After a quick spell with Mexico's Puebla FC, where he rejoined former Zaragoza teammate Francisco Higuera, Pardeza retired in 1999 at age 34. In June 2002, he became technical director of former side Zaragoza and, seven years later, he rejoined first club Real Madrid in the same capacity, following Florentino Pérez's return as president.

International career
After playing at youth and Olympic level, Pardeza earned five caps for Spain. He made his debut on 11 October 1989 in a 2–2 draw against Hungary in Budapest for the 1990 FIFA World Cup qualifiers, and his last appearance came in the finals in Italy on 21 June 1990, as he appeared two minutes in the 2–1 victory over Belgium.

Outside football
He also collaborated with newspapers and radios, and was a speaker for the Association of Spanish Footballers from 1990, acting as its secretary-general since 1996.

Honours
Real Madrid
La Liga: 1986–87

Zaragoza
Copa del Rey: 1985–86, 1993–94
UEFA Cup Winners' Cup: 1994–95

References

External links

1965 births
Living people
Sportspeople from the Province of Huelva
Spanish footballers
Footballers from Andalusia
Association football forwards
La Liga players
Segunda División players
Real Madrid Castilla footballers
Real Madrid CF players
Real Zaragoza players
Liga MX players
Club Puebla players
Spain youth international footballers
Spain under-21 international footballers
Spain under-23 international footballers
Spain international footballers
1990 FIFA World Cup players
Spanish expatriate footballers
Expatriate footballers in Mexico
Spanish expatriate sportspeople in Mexico
Real Madrid CF non-playing staff